Hygassos was a town of the Rhodian Peraea in ancient Caria, that was inhabited in the Hellenistic period. The name does not appear in inscriptions, but the demonym occurs frequently in ancient epigraphy.
 
Its site is located on Losta Bay, Bozburun Peninsula, Asiatic Turkey.

References

Populated places in ancient Caria
Former populated places in Turkey